Gillani Railway Station (Sindhi: گيلاني ريلوي اسٽيشن) is an abandoned railway station on Karachi Circular Railway loop line in Gulshan-e-Iqbal, Karachi, Pakistan. In the past, Pakistan Railways had a plan to establish a central railway station for Karachi there. For a while it was the terminus station of Tezrao and was a stop for the Chenab Express when it was running via the KCR loop for few years in the 1990s.

Possible re-opening
The station might re-open if a planned re-opening of the KCR loop as a rapid transit scheme goes ahead.

See also
 List of railway stations in Pakistan
 Pakistan Railways

References

External links

Railway stations in Karachi
Gulshan Town
Railway stations on Karachi Circular Railway